The Somali Family Development Organization is an organization in Somalia to support family development.

The organization was founded by Michael Gangnath and Andrew Hans in 2010 in response to a series of long term droughts that were affecting the area.  The droughts left the area's agricultural developments in disarray and unable to support the surrounding areas. The organization mainly dealt with providing short-term micro-loans to private contractors that infrastructure could be set up to support food delivery. The organization secondary goals with the help of Mason DeMelo were to help the families affected by the droughts that were unable to find work due to the largely agrarian economy by providing a SNAP program. A SNAP program is a Supplemental Nutrition Assistance Program that gives family coupons that can be exchanged for food and other essential items.

External links 

Non-profit organisations based in Somalia